Purgi, Burig, Purki, Purik, Purigi or Puriki (Tibetan script: ,) is a Tibetic language closely related to the Balti language. Purgi is natively spoken by the Purigpa people in Ladakh region of India and Baltistan region of Pakistan. 

Most of the Purigpas are Shia Muslims, although a significant number of them follow Noorbakhshi and Sunni Islam, and a small minority of Buddhists and Bön followers reside in areas like Fokar valley, Mulbekh, Wakha. Like the Baltis, they speak an archaic Tibetan dialect closely related to Balti and Ladakhi. Purki is more closely related to Balti than Ladakhi, so there are different opinions among linguists in considering Purki and Balti as different languages or simply different varieties of the same language.

References

External links
 Ethnic profile by Asia Harvest

Languages of Ladakh
Languages of Gilgit-Baltistan
Languages of Pakistan
Languages of India
Bodish languages